Icardo Center is a 3,497-seat multi-purpose arena in Bakersfield, California. It is home to the Cal State Bakersfield Roadrunners men's basketball, women's basketball, women's volleyball and wrestling teams. From the 1998–99 season through the 2013–14 season, the basketball teams played all or some of their games are in nearby Rabobank Arena, but the teams moved back to campus exclusively starting in the 2014–15 season.

See also
 List of NCAA Division I basketball arenas

References

External links
Stadium information

Cal State Bakersfield Roadrunners men's basketball
College basketball venues in the United States
College volleyball venues in the United States
Sports venues in Bakersfield, California
Basketball venues in California
Volleyball venues in California
Wrestling venues in California
1989 establishments in California
Sports venues completed in 1989